The Young Ottomans were a secret society established in 1865 by a group of Ottoman Turkish intellectuals who were dissatisfied with the Tanzimat reforms in the Ottoman Empire, which they believed did not go far enough. The Young Ottomans sought to transform the Ottoman society by preserving the Empire and modernizing it along the European tradition of adopting a constitutional government. Though the Young Ottomans were frequently in disagreement ideologically, they all agreed that the new constitutional government should continue to be at least somewhat rooted in Islam. To emphasize "the continuing and essential validity of Islam as the basis of Ottoman political culture" they attempted to syncretize an Islamic jurisprudence with liberalism and parliamentary democracy. The Young Ottomans sought for new ways to form a government like the European governments, especially the constitution of the Second French Empire. Among the prominent members of this society were writers and publicists such as İbrahim Şinasi, Namık Kemal, Ali Suavi, Ziya Pasha, and Agah Efendi.

In 1876, the Young Ottomans had their defining moment when Sultan Abdul Hamid II reluctantly promulgated the Ottoman constitution of 1876, the first attempt at a constitution in the Ottoman Empire, ushering in the First Constitutional Era. Although this period was short-lived, with Abdul Hamid II ultimately suspending the constitution and parliament in 1878 in favor of a return to absolute monarchy with himself in power, the influence of the Young Ottomans continued until the collapse of the empire. Several decades later, another group of reform-minded Ottomans, the Young Turks, repeated the Young Ottomans' efforts, leading to the Young Turk Revolution in 1908 and the beginning of the Second Constitutional Era.

Prominent figures

The prominent leaders and ideologists behind the Young Ottomans movement included:

 Writers and publicists:
 İbrahim Şinasi (1826–1871), founded the newspaper Tasvir-i Efkâr ("Illustration of Thoughts") in 1862 and imparted editorship of it to Namık Kemal in 1865.
 Namık Kemal (1840–1888), one of the founding members of the Young Ottomans in 1865 and publisher of many opposition newspapers; helped draft the constitution.
 Ziya Pasha (1825–1880), former secretariat of the palace who had been pressured out of his position and published newspapers in France with Namık Kemal.
 Ali Suavi (1838–1878), a teacher and preacher with religious training who edited the newspaper Muhbir. ("Reporter")
 Mehmed Bey, a leading reformer and one of the founding members of the Young Ottomans; nephew of Mahmud Nedim Pasha.
 Political figures:
 Midhat Pasha (1822–1883), Ottoman prime minister (grand vizier) and reformer who drafted and implemented the constitution.
 Mustafa Fazıl Pasha (1830–1875), brother to the viceroy of Egypt and grandson of Muhammad Ali of Egypt, principal benefactor and supporter of the Young Ottomans after formally organizing them in 1867 in Paris.

History

Formation

The Picnic at Belgrad Forest near Istanbul

In the summer of 1865, six young men convened at the Belgrad Forest (Turkish: Belgrad Ormanı) near Istanbul for a picnic to form a group that would become known as the Patriotic Alliance and would be the nucleus of the future Young Ottomans.

Almost all of the men in attendance had at one time or another worked in the Translation Bureau of the Sublime Porte (the metonymy for the Ottoman government) and therefore had knowledge of both European political systems and the inner workings of Ottoman foreign policy.

The six men in attendance were Mehmed Bey, Namık Kemal, Menâpirzâde Nuri, Reşat Bey, Ayetullah Bey, and Refik Bey, and all shared a desire to change the way the Ottomans interacted vis-à-vis the European powers in addition to the nature of rule in the empire.

The group attracted a moderate number of followers. "In the course of two years, a few hundred people seem to have joined the society, among them two nephews of the Sultan, Prince Murad (the crown prince) and Prince Hamid."

Exile to Paris
During the same year, İbrahim Şinasi left control of his newspaper Tasvir-i Efkâr to Namık Kemal, and it was under Kemal’s editorship that the paper became more radical. In 1867, Namık Kemal and other Young Ottomans published the open letter of a disgruntled Egyptian prince Mustafa Fazıl Pasha to the Ottoman Sultan Abdülaziz. This letter advocated constitutional and parliamentary governance. After the publication, the Ottoman government cracked down on the Young Ottomans, causing them to flee to Paris, where they continued operating under the patronage of Mustafa Fazıl Pasha. By the time these exiled publicists had come together under the patronage of Mustafa Fazıl Pasha  in Paris, they began calling themselves Yeni Osmanlılar.

Publications

Through the new medium of the press and with the financial support of their ally Mustafa Fazıl Pasha, the Young Ottomans were able to widely circulate their ideas in a number of publications. One of the most important periodicals was Hürriyet ("Freedom"), which was publicized by Namık Kemal and Ziya Pasha beginning in 1868, though many others were published and often took a more radical stance. Other Young Ottoman newspapers included Ulum ("Science"), Inkilab ("Revolution"), Ibret ("Lesson"), and Basiret. These publications voiced dissent and opposition to Ottoman policies that ordinarily would have been stifled. These periodicals circulated widely throughout Europe, having sites of publication in "London, Geneva, Paris, Lyon, and Marseille."

Return from exile
When Mehmed Fuad Pasha and Mehmed Emin Âli Pasha died in 1869 and 1871, respectively, two of the greatest obstacles to the initiatives of the Young Ottomans were now out of the picture, prompting a number of the exiles to return to Istanbul. The acceptance of Mustafa Fazıl Pasha to a post under Sultan Abdülaziz was also seen as evidence of imminent success. However, it was this return from exile that began to fracture the Young Ottomans, many of whom never shared any sort of established ideological consensus. Ali Suavi resigned from the group while Namık Kemal returned to Istanbul. Ziya Pasha, who had disagreed with Kemal, moved to Geneva to work on another newspaper. With his new Grand Vizier Mahmud Nedim Pasha, Sultan Abdülaziz reasserted his role as the absolute ruler, leaving many of the Young Ottomans disappointed after having been so hopeful that their reforms would be widely accepted.

Crisis and the Constitutional revolution

The Crisis of 1873–1878
During the reign of Sultan Abdülaziz, the Empire was experiencing a period of great financial hardship brought on by catastrophic drought and floods in Anatolia in 1873 and 1874. In an attempt to raise revenue, the government raised taxes on the surviving population, leading to discontent amongst the people. The financial difficulties were exacerbated by a global stock market crash in 1873.

Discontentment amongst the population grew, culminating in a series of revolts that broke out amongst the Christian peasants in the Balkans. Bosnia and Herzegovina were the first to experience rebellions, followed by Bulgaria in 1876. Accusations of atrocities being committed by the Turks, particularly in Bulgaria, did not go unnoticed by Russia, who went to war with the Ottomans on April 24, 1877.

The Constitutional revolution
According to Caroline Finkel, "the profound cultural dislocation and humiliation being experienced by the majority of Ottoman Muslims found expression at this juncture in strident criticism of the government for its appeasement of foreign powers." Due to the tumultuous environment, the Young Ottomans now had an audience, and action quickly followed. On May 30, 1876, a group of leading Ottoman politicians including Midhat Pasha staged a coup d’état and deposed Sultan Abdülaziz. Prince Murad, who was close with the Young Ottomans, was installed to the throne as Sultan Murad V. Murad had promised to institute the constitution, but he began to listen to his Grand Vizier Rüşdi Pasha, who advocated a cautious approach to reform. After the alleged suicide of Sultan Abdülaziz, Sultan Murad’s mental state began to rapidly decline and he became an alcoholic. "The suicide of his uncle and the murder of several members of his cabinet seem to have led to a severe nervous breakdown." As a result, after only three months on the throne, Murad was declared unfit to rule and was replaced by his younger brother, Hamit Efendi, who ascended to the throne on September 1, 1876 as Sultan Abdul Hamid II.

First Constitutional Era of the Ottoman Empire
The First Constitutional Era began on December 23, 1876, when Sultan Abdul Hamid II appointed Midhat Pasha as Grand Vizier and promulgated the Ottoman constitution of 1876, although his motives for doing so are suspect as they seemed to be aimed at appeasing Europeans who were in Istanbul for a conference. Indeed, Abdul Hamid II "was distrusted by both the Porte and by intellectuals. The ministers knew that he was deceitful and cunning, and they suspected that his rule would mean a return to imperial control over the affairs of the state." The first Ottoman parliament, the General Assembly of the Ottoman Empire, convened from March 19, 1877 to June 28, 1877 and only convened once more before being prorogued by Abdul Hamid II, ironically using his constitutional right to do so on February 13, 1878. He also dismissed Midhat Pasha and banished him from the empire, effectively ending the first constitutional era and marking a return to centralization of power under the Sultan.

Ideology
The Young Ottomans were not united by a single ideology and their views varied greatly within their own group. Yet they were brought together by a few central shared ideas and a common cause.

Constitutionalism
The Young Ottomans were brought together by their shared dislike of the bureaucratic and appeasing form that the government had taken on with the advent of the Tanzimat reforms. "Young Ottomans strongly criticized the Tanzimat as a capitulation to European dictates", which they believed was one of the primary reasons for the poor state of the empire. The Young Ottomans called for the development of a constitutional government that was grounded in Islamic concepts, not only to differentiate it from the European governments that they were looking to for inspiration, but also because they wished to preserve one of the core features of Ottoman culture. "There was an emphasis on the fatherland and the idea that Ottomans should share devotion to their country. This marked the beginning of a common feeling of territorial patriotism."

Ottomanism
"One of the most noticeable ideas that came from the Young Ottoman movement was the idea of Ottoman Patriotism. This is the belief of Ottoman equality as citizens. This can be seen in Young Ottoman Namık Kemal's famous play Vatan." The play explores the ideas of devotion and loyalties to territories and nations, rather than religious communities. "This was the beginning of territorial patriotism in the area." In the face of the emerging national identities in Europe, the desire for a definition of patriotic Ottoman identity became a unifying factor amongst many lead Young Ottomans. The desired goal of Ottomanism was to overcome the tensions between the Muslim and non-Muslim subjects of the empire and unite them through allegiance to the state.

Islamism
While the Young Ottomans looked to the Europeans for a model of constitutional government, they maintained that it should be developed within the framework of Islam to emphasize "the continuing and essential validity of Islam as the basis of Ottoman political culture."

Liberalism
The Young Ottomans syncretized islamic idealism with modern liberalism and parliamentary democracy, to them the European parliamentary liberalism was a model to follow, in accordance with the tenets of Islam and "attempted to reconcile Islamic concepts of government with the ideas of Montesquieu, Danton, Rousseau, and contemporary European Scholars and statesmen." Namık Kemal, who was influential in the formation of the society, admired the constitution of the French Third Republic, he summed up the Young Ottomans' political ideals as "the sovereignty of the nation, the separation of powers, the responsibility of officials, personal freedom, equality, freedom of thought, freedom of press, freedom of association, enjoyment of property, sanctity of the home".

Legacy and influence
One of their greatest legacies of the Young Ottomans in the Ottoman Empire was in their actions, as they were "regarded as the first modern ideological movement among the Ottoman elite of the empire, and they were the first who, through their writings, consciously tried to create and influence public opinion." The use of the press as a tool of political criticism is also attributed to the innovation of the Young Ottomans. Additionally, by assigning new meanings to liberal terminology, with terms such as vatan ("motherland") and hürriyet ("liberty"), leading Young Ottomans such as Namık Kemal lent the powerful expression of ideologies to later nationalist and liberal groups within the Ottoman Empire.

As the first group to address the issue of Western modernity, future revolutionary movements such as the Young Turks drew both methods and ideology from the Young Ottomans, though they tended to focus on patriotic Ottomanism rather than their emphasis on a return to the fundamentals of Islam. Additionally, their efforts that contributed to the promulgation of the first Ottoman constitution set an important precedent for the Second Constitutional Era of the Ottoman Empire (1908–1918), which began with the Young Turks finally deposing Abdul Hamid II, the same monarch that the Young Ottomans had clashed with, from the throne in the Young Turk Revolution.

See also
 Young Turks
 Ottomanism
 First Constitutional Era (Ottoman Empire)
The Ottomans: Europe's Muslim Emperors

Notes

Bibliography
 Ágoston, Gábor and Bruce Masters (2008). Encyclopedia of the Ottoman Empire, Facts on File. .
 Akgunduz, Ahmet and Said Ozturk (2011). Ottoman History: Misperceptions and Truths, IUR Press. .
 Finkel, Caroline (2006). Osman’s Dream: the Story of the Ottoman Empire, Basic Books. .
 Hanioğlu, M. Şükrü (2008). A Brief History of the Late Ottoman Empire, Princeton University Press. .
 Lapidus, Ira Marvin (2002). A History of Islamic Societies, Cambridge University Press, .
 Mardin, Şerif (1962). The Genesis of Young Ottoman Thought, Princeton University Press. . Reprinted in 2000 as The Genesis of Young Ottoman Thought: A Study in the Modernization of Turkish Political Ideas, Syracuse University Press, .
 Somel, Selçuk Akşin (2003). Historical Dictionary of the Ottoman Empire, Scarecrow Press. .
 Zürcher, Erik J. (2004). Turkey: A Modern History, I.B. Tauris, .

Further reading
Amin, Camron Michael, Benjamin C. Fortna, and Elizabeth B. Frierson. (2007). The Modern Middle East: A Sourcebook for History, Oxford University Press. .
Kuru, Ahmet T. and Alfred Stepan (2012). Democracy, Islam, and Secularism in Turkey, Columbia University Press. .
Mardin, Şerif, "Young Ottomans," in The Oxford Encyclopedia of the Modern Islamic World, vol. 4 (New York: Oxford University Press, 1995), 357.

External links
  The text of the 1876 Ottoman constitution in addition to amendments made by the 1909 constitution (website)

Political movements of the Ottoman Empire
Political parties established in 1867
Reform in the Ottoman Empire